The 1999 Huntingdonshire District Council election took place on 6 May 1999 to elect members of Huntingdonshire District Council in Cambridgeshire, England. One third of the council was up for election and the Conservative Party stayed in overall control of the council.

After the election, the composition of the council was:
Conservative 36
Liberal Democrats 14
Independent 2
Vacant 1

Election result

Ward results

By-elections between 1999 and 2000

References

1999 English local elections
1999
20th century in Cambridgeshire